"Mona Lisa Lost Her Smile" is a song written by Johnny Cunningham and recorded by David Allan Coe. It was the first single from Coe's 1984 album Just Divorced, and was released to radio in early 1984. The song is Coe's highest-charting single, with a peak of number two on the U.S. country music charts.

Content
The song is a mid-tempo ballad about a young blonde girl, featuring allusions to the iconic Da Vinci painting.

Critical reception
Thom Jurek of Allmusic described the song favorably in his review, saying that "[t]he layered strings and organ work are slick, but they add such warmth and depth in contrast to Coe's voice that it works to devastating effect."

Chart performance
The song spent twenty-two weeks on the Billboard country singles charts, reaching a peak of number two and accounting for Coe's highest peak there. In Canada, it reached Number One on the RPM Country Tracks charts dated for June 30, 1984.

Weekly charts

Year-end charts

References

1984 singles
David Allan Coe songs
Song recordings produced by Billy Sherrill
1984 songs